Viktor Fyodorovich Karpukhin (October 27, 1947 – March 24, 2003) was a member of the KGB who was instrumental in the Soviet–Afghan War.

He was born in the Ukrainian city of Lutsk. He joined the KGB's crack Alpha Group (AG) in 1967 and worked his way up to  become its commander in 1988.

On December 23, 1979, Karpukhin led 38 soldiers of the AG into Afghanistan, who along with 500 Soviet paratroopers, landed at Bagram Airfield, next to the capital Kabul. Two days later, 40,000 Soviet Army soldiers poured over the Afghan border.

Stationed in the Soviet embassy in Kabul, which was close to the Tajbeg Palace of President Hafizullah Amin, Karpukhin's forces awaited further instructions. On December 27, Karpukhin was ordered to take the presidential palace. In the attack, two Soviet soldiers were killed, and Amin was shot to death. The following day, Prime Minister Babrak Karmal took Amin's seat as president. Karpukhin was awarded the Hero of the Soviet Union medal for his role.

Karpukhin retired from the Alpha Group in 1992, and worked in various government and commercial ventures.

References 

1947 births
2003 deaths
KGB officers
Heroes of the Soviet Union
People from Lutsk
Recipients of the Order of the Red Banner
Soviet major generals
Soviet military personnel of the Soviet–Afghan War